Fermín Revueltas Sánchez (July 7, 1901 in Santiago Papasquiaro – September 7, 1935 in Mexico City) was a Mexican painter.

Biography 
 

Fermín Revueltas was son of Gregorio Revueltas Gutiérrez and his wife Romana Sánchez Arias. The Revueltas Sánchez family came from the North of Mexico, and lived in Guadalajara, Jalisco, from 1910 to 1913. Due to the revolution, the father decided that Fermín and his brother Silvestre had to visit school in the United States. He attended St. Edward's College from 1917 to 1920, and afterwards he continued his studies in Chicago. Back in Mexico, Fermín Revueltas visited the open-air painting school in Coyoacán. He became director of the "José María Velasco" school in Guadalupe, a part of Mexico City, and in 1923 he painted murals at the Escuela Nacional Preparatoria alongside others. In 1928 he joined the Partido Comunista Mexicano. Revueltas participated in several artist groups, amongst others he joined the Stridentism movement, and was member of the ¡30-30! group. When he died at the age of 34 years, many of his works were unfinished.<ref name="blaisten">Fermín Revueltas , Museo Andrés Blaisten.</ref>

In 1991, Javier Audirac filmed a documentary about him, entitled Fermín Revueltas o El color (Fermín Revueltas or The color).

 References 

External links
 
 

 Bibliography 
Zurián, Carla. Fermín Revueltas. Constructor de espacios'', México: Editorial RM - INBA, 2002.

1901 births
1935 deaths
Artists from Durango
People from Santiago Papasquiaro
Mexican communists
20th-century Mexican painters
Mexican male painters
Mexican muralists
20th-century Mexican male artists